Brucella inopinata is a Gram-negative, nonmotile, non-spore-forming coccoid bacterium, first isolated from a breast implant infection site. Its type strain is BO1T (=BCCN 09-01T =CPAM 6436T). It is a potential cause of brucellosis.

References

Further reading

Banai, Menachem, and Michael Corbel. "Taxonomy of Brucella." Open Veterinary Science Journal 4.1 (2010): 85–101.

External links
LPSN

Type strain of Brucella inopinata at BacDive -  the Bacterial Diversity Metadatabase

Hyphomicrobiales
Bacteria described in 2010